The Devil Commands is a 1941 American horror film directed by Edward Dmytryk and starring Boris Karloff. The working title of the film was The Devil Said No. In it, a man obsessed with contacting his dead wife falls in with a sinister phony medium. The Devil Commands is one of the many films from the 1930s and 1940s in which Karloff was cast as a mad scientist with a good heart. It was one of the last in line of the low-budget horror films that were produced before Universal Studios' The Wolf Man. The story was adapted from the novel The Edge of Running Water by William Sloane.

Plot
Dr. Julian Blair is engaged in unconventional research on human brain waves when his wife Helen (Shirley Warde) is tragically killed in an auto accident. The grief-stricken scientist becomes obsessed with redirecting his work into making contact with the dead and is not deterred by dire warnings from his daughter Anne (Amanda Duff), his research assistant Richard (Richard Fiske), or his colleagues that he is delving into forbidden areas of knowledge. He moves his laboratory to an isolated New England mansion where he continues to try to reach out to his dead wife. He is aided in his experiments by his mentally-challenged servant Karl (Ralph Penney) and abetted by the obsessive Mrs. Walters (Anne Revere), a phony medium, who believes in his work and seems to exert a sinister influence over him. When their overly curious housekeeper discovers the truth about their experiments, her death brings the local sheriff in to investigate the strange goings on.

Cast
 Boris Karloff as Dr. Julian Blair
 Richard Fiske as Dr. Richard Sayles
 Amanda Duff as Anne Blair
 Anne Revere as Mrs. Walters
 Ralph Penney as Karl
 Dorothy Adams as Mrs. Marcy
 Walter Baldwin as Seth Marcy
 Kenneth MacDonald as Sheriff Ed Willis
 Shirley Warde as Helen Blair

Reception
From retrospective reviews, Tony Rayns reviewed the film in Sight & Sound as part of the Karloff at Columbia Blu-ray set. Rayns compared the films to The Black Room, The Man They Could Not Hang, The Man With Nine Lives, Before I Hang, and The Boogie Man Will Get You noting that stand out of the set was The Devil Commands. with "Karloff denouncing fake spiritualists and seeking a scientific way to contact his beloved late wife."

See also
 Boris Karloff filmography

Notes

References

External links

 
 
 

1941 films
1941 horror films
American science fiction horror films
1940s science fiction horror films
American black-and-white films
Films directed by Edward Dmytryk
Columbia Pictures films
1940s English-language films
1940s American films